The Skeleton Coast is the northern part of the Atlantic coast of Namibia and south of Angola from the Kunene River south to the Swakop River, although the name is sometimes used to describe the entire Namib Desert coast. The indigenous San people (formerly known as Bushmen), of the Namibian interior called the region "The Land God Made in Anger", while Portuguese sailors once referred to it as "The Gates of Hell". 

On the coast, the upwelling of the cold Benguela current gives rise to dense ocean fogs (called cassimbo by the Angolans) for much of the year. The winds blow from land to sea, rainfall rarely exceeds  annually, and the climate is highly inhospitable. There is a constant, heavy surf on the beaches. In the days before engine-powered ships and boats, it was possible to get ashore through the surf but impossible to launch from the shore. The only way out was by going through a marsh hundreds of kilometres long and only accessible via a hot and arid desert.

The coast is largely soft sand occasionally interrupted by rocky outcrops. The southern section consists of gravel plains, while north of Terrace Bay the landscape is dominated by high sand dunes. Skeleton Bay is now known as a great location for surfing. The Saltyjackal, a surf camp located in Swakopmund, Namibia, is currently the only group that runs guided surf trips along the Skeleton Coast.

Etymology

The area's name derives from the whale and seal bones that once littered the shore from the whaling industry, although in modern times the coast harbours the skeletal remains of the shipwrecks caught by offshore rocks and fog. More than a thousand such vessels of various sizes litter the coast, notably the Eduard Bohlen, Benguela Eagle, Otavi, Dunedin Star and Tong Taw.

The name "Skeleton Coast" was coined by John Henry Marsh as the title for the book he wrote chronicling the shipwreck of the Dunedin Star. Since the book was first published in 1944, it has become so well known that the coast is now generally referred to as Skeleton Coast and is given that as its official name on most maps today. See , below.

History

One of the oldest shipwrecks in the Skeleton Coast region is the wreck near the town of Oranjemund which was wrecked during the 1530s. It is known to be one of the oldest discovered shipwrecks of the Iberian Atlantic tradition in Sub-Saharan Africa. On Thursday, 22 March 2018, a Japanese registered fishing vessel, MVF Fukuseki Maru, got into trouble and ran aground near Durissa Bay, south of the Ugab River mouth, about 200 km from Walvis Bay, lying 2 km from the Skeleton Coast beach. All 24 foreign crew members were rescued by Namibian authorities.

Past human occupation by Strandlopers is shown by shell middens of white mussels found along parts of the Skeleton Coast.

Wildlife

Namibia has declared the  Skeleton Coast National Park over much of the area, from the Ugab River to the Kunene. The northern half of the park is a designated wilderness area. Notable features are the clay castles of the Hoarusib River, the Agate Mountain salt pans and the large seal colony at Cape Fria. The remainder of the coast is the National West Coast Recreation Area. The national park would be part of the proposed Iona – Skeleton Coast Transfrontier Conservation Area.

The coast has been the subject of a number of wildlife documentaries, particularly concerning adaptations to extreme aridity,  including the 1965 National Geographic documentary Survivors of the Skeleton Coast. Many of the plant and insect species of the sand dune systems depend on the thick sea fogs which engulf the coast for their moisture and windblown detritus from the interior as food. The desert bird assemblages have been studied in terms of their thermoregulation, coloration, breeding strategies and nomadism.

The riverbeds further inland are home to baboons, giraffes, lions, black rhinoceros, spotted and brown hyena, as well as springbok. The animals get most of their water from wells dug by the baboons or elephants. The black rhinoceros population was the main reason why the CBBC show Serious Desert was filmed in the region.

In popular culture

Skeleton Coast is a book by John Henry Marsh. The true story of the wrecking in 1942 of the British refrigerated cargo liner Dunedin Star and the eventual rescue of all her 106 passengers and crew, at the cost of a tug, an SAAF aircraft and the lives of two rescuers.
Skeleton Coast is a novel by Clive Cussler that uses the shifting sands of the coastline as a prominent plot device in the fourth entry in the Oregon Files. 
The plot of the 1968 fiction film A Twist of Sand involves diamonds hidden in a shipwreck buried in the sand dunes of the Skeleton Coast.
Much of season 1, episode 7 of Amazon's The Grand Tour was filmed on the Skeleton Coast.
The final scenes of Golden Urchin by Madeleine Brent (a pseudonym of Peter O'Donnell) take place along the Skeleton Coast down to Swakopmund.
The first episode of Wonders of the Universe featured the Skeleton Coast, and the shipwrecks there were utilized as part of an analogy by Brian Cox to demonstrate the effects of time.
Drummer Billy Cobham has written an album inspired by his visit to the area, called Tales from the Skeleton Coast.
Punk rock band The Lawrence Arms released their seventh LP, Skeleton Coast, named in reference to the region.
 Dude You’re Screwed - Season 2 Episode 1

References

External links
Skeleton Coast
Animals of the Skeleton Coast
PBS Golden Seals of the Skeleton Coast
Animals of the Skeleton Coast Adapted to a Desert Habitat
The true story of the wrecking of the big British passenger liner Dunedin Star and the eventual rescue of her more than 100 passengers and crew

Tourism in Namibia
National parks of Namibia
History of Namibia
Coasts of Namibia